Krokinas of Larissa or Kroukinas (5th-4th century BC) was an Ancient Greek athlete, who won the stadion (404 BC) and the diaulos (396 BC) of the 94th and later 96th Olympic Games.

References 

5th-century BC Greek people
Ancient Thessalian athletes
Ancient Olympic competitors
Ancient Thessalians
Ancient Greek runners